Konstantin "Kostya" Mikhailovich Khanin is a Russian mathematician and physicist. He served as Chair (academic) of the Department of Mathematical and Computational Sciences at the University of Toronto Mississauga.

Background 
Khanin received his PhD from the Landau Institute of Theoretical Physics in Moscow and continued working there as a Research Associate until 1994. Afterwards, he taught at Princeton University, at the Isaac Newton Institute in Cambridge, and at Heriot-Watt University before joining the faculty at the University of Toronto. Khanin was an invited speaker at the European Congress of Mathematics in Barcelona in 2000. He was a 2013 Simons Foundation Fellow. He held the Jean-Morlet Chair at the Centre International de Rencontres Mathématiques in 2017, and he was an Invited Speaker at the International Congress of Mathematicians in 2018 in Rio de Janeiro. In 2021 he was awarded The Humboldt Prize, also known as the Humboldt Research Award, in recognition of his lifetime's research achievements.

References

Living people
Landau Institute for Theoretical Physics alumni
Princeton University faculty
Academic staff of the University of Toronto
Mathematical physicists
Russian mathematicians
Year of birth missing (living people)